P125 may refer to:

 British Aerospace P.125, a British fighter aircraft design study
 Papyrus 125, a biblical manuscript
 , a patrol vessel of the Turkish Navy
 Yamaha P-125, a portable digital piano
 P125, a state regional road in Latvia